Bruno Ignacio Barranco (born 13 March 1997) is an Argentine professional footballer who plays as a centre-forward for Italian Serie D club Stresa Vergante.

Career

Ferro Carril Oeste
Barranco's first senior club became Ferro Carril Oeste in 2016. He made his professional debut in a Primera B Nacional fixture on 9 December versus Brown, he was previously an unused substitute a week prior against Atlético Paraná. In the following July, Barranco scored his first goals against Atlético Paraná and Guillermo Brown. He matched that tally in his second campaign, netting twice across seventeen fixtures.

In January 2020, Ferro announced Barranco had been loaned to Slovenian Second League side Krško. However, the forward didn't officially sign for the club despite featuring and scoring in friendly matches. He returned to Argentina in March, prior to filing a freedom of action request against Ferro for lack of payment - the club in turn filed a complaint to the AFA about Barranco's representatives and father. He was allowed to leave in July.

Olympiacos Volos
In the succeeding September, Barranco headed to Europe with Football League Greece club Olympiacos Volos. He wouldn't initially appear competitively for them due to delays caused by the COVID-19 pandemic. Ahead of January 2021, it was announced that Barranco was to be transferred to Greek top-flight outfit AEL; penning terms until 2024. However, on 23 December 2020, the deal was cancelled due to the player wanting a shorter contract than previously agreed. On 8 February, Barranco was loaned to Doxa Drama in the Super League 2.

Career statistics
.

References

External links

1997 births
Footballers from Buenos Aires
Living people
Argentine footballers
Association football forwards
Ferro Carril Oeste footballers
Olympiacos Volos F.C. players
Doxa Drama F.C. players
Primera Nacional players
Super League Greece 2 players
Serie D players
Argentine expatriate footballers
Expatriate footballers in Greece
Argentine expatriate sportspeople in Greece
Expatriate footballers in Italy
Argentine expatriate sportspeople in Italy